Amirjanov is an Azerbaijani surname. 

People bearing this surname include:

Abdulali bey Amirjanov - Minister of Finance and State Controller of Azerbaijan Democratic Republic
Ruslan Amirjanov - Azerbaijani professional footballer playing for Neftchi Baku

Azerbaijani-language surnames